Together Again is a 1977 studio album by singer Tony Bennett, accompanied by jazz pianist Bill Evans. It was originally issued on Bennett's own Improv Records label, which went out of business later that year, but was subsequently reissued on Concord.

Their first album together, The Tony Bennett/Bill Evans Album, was released by Fantasy Records in 1975. Both albums plus alternate takes and additional tracks were released on The Complete Tony Bennett/Bill Evans Recordings by Fantasy in 2009.

Critical reception
The AllMusic review by William Ruhlman awarded the album 3 stars writing "If anything, Evans dominates this encounter more than he did the first, but it's still a good showcase for Bennett, too."

Track listing
 "The Bad and the Beautiful" (Dory Langdon, David Raksin) – 2:18
 "Lucky to Be Me" (Leonard Bernstein, Betty Comden, Adolph Green) – 3:45
 "Make Someone Happy" (Betty Comden, Adolph Green, Jule Styne) – 3:53
 "You're Nearer"  (Lorenz Hart, Richard Rodgers) – 2:23
 "A Child Is Born" (Thad Jones, Alec Wilder) – 3:17
 "The Two Lonely People" (Bill Evans, Carol Hall) – 4:27
 "You Don't Know What Love Is" (Gene de Paul, Don Raye) – 3:27
 "Maybe September" (Ray Evans, Percy Faith, Jay Livingston) – 3:55
 "Lonely Girl" (Ray Evans, Jay Livingston, Neal Hefti) – 2:49
 "You Must Believe in Spring" (Alan Bergman, Marilyn Bergman, Jacques Demy) – 5:51

Bonus tracks on CD reissue:
"Who Can I Turn To (When Nobody Needs Me)"  (Leslie Bricusse, Anthony Newley) – 2:28
 "Dream Dancing"  (Cole Porter) – 3:46

Personnel
Tony Bennett - vocals
Bill Evans - piano

References

1977 albums
Tony Bennett albums
Bill Evans albums
Vocal–instrumental duet albums